Christopher Davies (born 29 June 1946) is a British sailor. He won a gold medal in the Flying Dutchman Class with Rodney Pattisson at the 1972 Summer Olympics.

He now sails at Portchester Sailing club, within the upper reaches of Portsmouth Harbour. He currently sails a Solo or a Siren with his wife Ingrid.

References

External links
 
 
 
 

1946 births
Living people
British male sailors (sport)
Olympic sailors of Great Britain
Olympic gold medallists for Great Britain
Olympic medalists in sailing
Sailors at the 1972 Summer Olympics – Flying Dutchman
Medalists at the 1972 Summer Olympics